"A Huge Ever Growing Pulsating Brain That Rules from the Centre of the Ultraworld" is the debut single by the ambient house group The Orb.  It was originally released in October 1989 and made the UK Singles Chart in 1990, peaking at #78. The 'Peel Session' version was also voted into #10 place in John Peel's 1990 Festive Fifty. In April 1991, it was released on the debut album The Orb's Adventures Beyond the Ultraworld.  The title is taken from a sound effects track from Blake's 7 on BBC Sound Effects No. 26 - Sci-Fi Sound Effects titled "The Core, A Huge Evergrowing Pulsating Brain which Rules from the Centre of Ultraworld".

The ethereal chord progression used throughout was sampled from the Grace Jones classic "Slave to the Rhythm" in particular the album version (6'35)

The song was featured on the soundtrack of the video game Grand Theft Auto: Episodes from Liberty City.

History
Throughout 1989, The Orb, along with Martin "Youth" Glover, developed the musical genre of ambient house through use of a diverse array of samples and recordings.  The culmination of their musical work came when The Orb recorded a session for John Peel on BBC Radio 1.  The track, then known as "Loving You", was largely improvisational; it included sound effects and samples from science fiction radio plays, nature sounds, and Minnie Riperton's "Lovin' You". For its release as a single on record label Big Life, The Orb changed the title to "A Huge Ever Growing Pulsating Brain That Rules From the Centre of the Ultraworld".  Upon the single's release, Riperton's management forced Big Life to remove the unlicensed Riperton sample, ensuring that only the initial first-week release of the single contained the original vocals of Minnie Riperton; subsequent pressings used vocals from a sound-alike.

The single is 19 minutes and seven seconds long. It reached #78 on the UK singles chart. For their early releases The Orb often included "Orbital" remixes, which were by the band themselves. Following this single and its immediate follow-up the band discontinued the practice in order to avoid confusion with the band Orbital.

Track listing

12": WAU! Mr.Modo / MWS 17T (UK)

 "A Huge Ever Growing Pulsating Brain... – Loving You" (Orbital Mix) – 19:07
 "A Huge Ever Growing Pulsating Brain..." (Bucket and Spade Mix) – 5:50
 "A Huge Ever Growing Pulsating Brain..." (Why Is Six Scared of Seven?) – 5:30
 Released October 1989

12": WAU! Mr.Modo / MWS 17R (UK)

 "A Huge Ever Growing Remix" (Orbital Dance Mix) – 7:05
 "A Huge Ever Growing Remix" (Orbital Radio Mix) – 3:34
 "A Huge Ever Growing Remix" (Aubrey Mix Mk 2) – 8:38
 Released January 1990

CD: Big Life / BLR 270CD (UK)

 "A Huge Ever Growing Pulsating Brain... – Loving You" (Orbital Mix) – 19:07
 Called "Compactdisc"
 Released June 1990, re-issued March 1994 [BLRDB 27]

CD: Big Life / BLR 27CD (UK)

 "A Huge Ever Growing Pulsating Brain..." (Orbital Dance Mix) – 8:19
 "A Huge Ever Growing Pulsating Brain..." (Orbital 9AM Radio Mix) – 3:11
 "A Huge Ever Growing Pulsating Brain..." (Aubrey Mix Mk 1) – 6:06
 Labeled as "Jimmy Cauty Remixes"
 "Aubrey Mix Mk 1" is an edit of "Aubrey Mix Mk 2"
 Called "Compactdisco"
 Released July 1990, re-issued March 1994 [BLRDA 27]

References

1989 debut singles
The Orb songs
1989 songs
Songs written by Simon Darlow
Songs written by Stephen Lipson
Songs written by Bruce Woolley
Songs written by Trevor Horn
Big Life Records singles